Liriomyza eupatorii is a species of fly in the family Agromyzidae. The fly, is found in Europe and was described by the German entomolgist, Johann Heinrich Kaltenbach in 1874.

The larvae mine the leaves of the Asteraceae and the Lamiaceae, including Aster species, lesser snakeroot (Ageratina aromatica), hemp-agrimony (Eupatorium cannabinum), red hemp-nettle (Galeopsis ladanum var. angustifolia), hairy hemp-nettle (Galeopsis pubescens), downy hemp-nettle (Galeopsis segetum), large-flowered hemp-nettle (Galeopsis speciosa), common hemp-nettle (Galeopsis tetrahit), sunflowers (Helianthus species), common nipplewort (Lapsana communis) and European goldenrod (Solidago virgaurea).

References

Agromyzidae
Articles created by Qbugbot
Insects described in 1874
Insects of Europe
Leaf miners